Alpo is an American brand of dog food marketed and manufactured by the Nestlé Purina PetCare subsidiary of Nestlé. The brand is offered as a canned or packaged soft food, as well as in dry kibbles.

History
Alpo, an abbreviation of Allen Products, was founded in 1936 by Robert F. Hunsicker in Allentown, Pennsylvania. The original factory was located in a small building at the southwest corner of New and Cedar streets.

In 1964, the Allen Products Company was acquired by Liggett & Myers Tobacco Company.  In 1980, the Liggett & Myers Tobacco Company was acquired by Grand Metropolitan; and, in 1986, Grand Metropolitan sold the Liggett Group, but retained Alpo Petfoods, Inc. In 1995, Nestlé SA acquired Alpo Petfoods, Inc. from Grand Metropolitan. In January 2001, Nestlé SA announced the merger of Nestlé Friskies with Ralston Purina to form the Nestlé Purina PetCare Company.

Marketing
For many years, the brand's main television commercial spokesman was Lorne Greene, who created the concept of eating one's own dog food by claiming that Alpo is so good he feeds it to his own dogs. Ed McMahon also had a long association with the product on television, and Garfield was a "spokescat" for the brand in the 1990s. Alpo was the sponsor of the debut broadcast of the long-running television news magazine 60 Minutes, on September 24, 1968.

Alpo is also known for its marketing campaigns that target the owners of "real dogs", making light of consumers who pamper their dogs.

References

External links 

Press Release on recall from Purina.com
Alpo TV ad with Ed McMahon
Alpo TV ad with Lorne Greene

Dog food brands
Nestlé brands
Ralston Purina products
Products introduced in 1936